Optimus Rhyme is the self-titled debut album from nerdcore band Optimus Rhyme, released March 15, 2004.

Track listing
All songs written by Optimus Rhyme, lyrics by Wheelie Cyberman, Broken English.

 "Intro" – 1:06
 "Reboot" – 1:30
 "Cybernetic Circuits" – 2:17
 "Reel Estate" – 4:08
 "DJ Slaylord (Skit)" – 0:32
 "Powder Blue Egg Hatch" – 2:26
 "Incognito" – 1:53
 "Ford vs. Chevy" – 4:24
 "Precognito" – 1:17
 "Fuzzy Dice" – 5:11
 "Organix" – 1:12
 "No Memory" - 1:31
 "JZ75" - 2:18
 "Transform" - 2:07
 "Slippery" - 2:01
 "I Heart PuBotCs" - 3:37
 "3cogni2" - 1:02
 "Precogni2" - 4:35

Personnel
Wheelie Cyberman – lead vocals
Broken English - backing vocals
Powerthighs – guitar
Stumblebee – bass
Grimrock – drums

References

Optimus Rhyme albums
2004 debut albums